The Argentina national futsal team represents Argentina during international futsal competitions. It is governed by the Asociación del Fútbol Argentino.

Argentina has qualified and participated in all eight FIFA Futsal World Cup tournaments and along with Brazil and Spain are the only national teams that have won the FIFA Futsal World Cup, in which Argentina are the defending champions, having won it in 2016. Argentina has also won the Copa América three times, in 2003, 2015, and 2022. Argentina is ranked 4th in the FIFA Futsal World Rankings.

In FIFUSA/AMF, Argentina won the 1994 FIFUSA Futsal World Cup and 2019 AMF Futsal Men's World Cup.

In IBSA, los Murciélagos have been crowned world champions twice in the Blind Soccer/Futsal World Championship, and in 2015 won its third world title: the IBSA World Games 2015. Los Murciélagos also won the Blind Futsal Copa Amèrica. Only Brazil and Argentina have won the Blind Futsal Copa Amèrica.

Results and fixtures

The following is a list of match results in the last 12 months, as well as any future matches that have been scheduled.
Legend

2021 FIFA World Cup

Team

Current squad
The following players were called up to the Argentina squad for the 2022 Futsal Finalissima.
Head coach: Matías Lucuix

Recent call-ups
The following players have also been called up to the squad within the last 12 months.

COV Player withdrew from the squad due to contracting COVID-19.
INJ Player withdrew from the squad due to an injury.
PRE Preliminary squad.
RET Retired from international futsal.

Competitive record

FIFA Futsal World Cup

Copa América de Futsal

FIFA Futsal World Cup qualification (CONMEBOL)
2012 –  Champions
2016 –  2nd place
2020 -  Champions

AMF Futsal World Cup
1982 – Seventh place
1985 – Fourth place
1988 – Seventh place
1991 – Fifth place
1994 –  Champions (host)
1997 – Fifth place
2000 –  3rd place
2003 – Quarterfinals
2007 –  2nd place (host)
2011 –  3rd place
2015 –  3rd place
2019 –  Champions (host)

Futsal Confederations Cup
2009 – Did not enter
2013 – Did not enter
2014 –  Champions

Pan American Games
2007 –  2nd place

Grand Prix de Futsal
2005 –  3rd place
2006 – Fourth place
2007 –  3rd place 
2008 –  2nd place 
2009 – Fifth place
2010 – Seventh place
2011 –  3rd place
2013 – Fifth place
2014 – Did not enter
2015 – Did not enter

Futsal Mundialito
1994 –  Did not enter
1995 – Sixth place
1996 –  3rd place
1998 –  2nd place
2001 –  2nd place
2002 – Fourth place
2006 –  Did not enter
2007 –  Did not enter
2008 –  Did not enter

FIFUSA/AMF Futsal U-20 World Cup
2014 –  Champions

IBSA Blind Futsal World Championship
2002 –  Champions 
2006 –  Champions

IBSA World Games
2015 –  Champions

References

External links
 Official website

Argentina
National
Futsal